Louis Kondos (born 13 February 1946, Athens, Greece), is a Greek soap opera actor. He appeared on Kalimera Zoi on the ANT1 network from 1994 until the show's end in 2006.

References

1946 births
Living people
Greek male television actors
Male actors from Athens
20th-century Greek male actors
21st-century Greek male actors